6 Lyncis b (abbreviated 6 Lyn b) is an extrasolar planet orbiting the K-type subgiant star 6 Lyncis which is approximately 182 light years away in the Lynx constellation. The planet has a minimum mass . The orbital period for this planet is 899 days, or 2.46 years. The orbital radius for this planet is 2.2 AU, periastron 1.9 AU, and apastron 2.5 AU, corresponding to the orbital eccentricity of 0.134. This planet was discovered on July 3, 2008 by Sato et al., who used Doppler spectroscopy to find variations of the line of sight motion of the star caused by the planet’s gravity during its orbit.

See also
 14 Andromedae b
 41 Lyncis b
 81 Ceti b

References

External links
 
 

Lynx (constellation)
Giant planets
Exoplanets discovered in 2008
Exoplanets detected by radial velocity